is a fictional character who appears in the light novel, anime, and manga series High School DxD authored by Ichiei Ishibumi. Rias is the main love interest of the main character, Issei Hyoudou. Rias is a high school student at Kuoh Academy, which, unbeknownst to most students, contains angels, devils, and fallen angels as part of its student population. High School DxD is set in a world where there is constant battle between these three main factions (angels, devils, fallen angels), though the war has died down as of late, and many famous angels and devils have already ceased to exist.

A devil of the Gremory clan, one of the highest-ranking devil families, Rias initially saves Issei after he was attacked by a fallen angel, Raynare. Issei wakes up the next morning, thinking that the events that occurred were all just a dream, but then notices Rias naked in his room. Rias reveals to Issei her true identity as a devil and says that as a result of his death at the hands of Raynare, she has reincarnated him as a devil, becoming his new master in the process. Rias is the head of Kuoh Academy's Occult Research school club, where Issei, Rias, and the club members interact with various groups and organizations, some of which are run by devils who compete against them in sanctioned combat matches called Rating Games, where the characters have been assigned positions akin to chess pieces.

Rias has received mostly positive critical reception. Reviewers have complimented the character's design, personality, and relationship with Issei, as well as her physical attractiveness. Her backstory has also been the recipient of some praise, though some reviewers have critiqued her character as uninteresting. Rias has achieved popularity in anime and manga fandom, and has appeared on numerous lists and surveys of the most popular anime and manga characters. Numerous High School DxD merchandise featuring Rias have also been released, including figurines and video games. The character is also a popular choice amongst cosplayers.

Conception and creation

Author Ichiei Ishibumi mentioned that Rias was developed into a second lead character and heroine, and Asia to be the second heroine, as well as Issei the protagonist, in the afterword of the first light novel. Some of his characters are loosely referenced from the Bible, non-fiction books, and mythology, and he created a world with a war being waged between three major factions (angels, devils, and fallen angels) with Rias being a devil. In Volume 5 of the light novels, Ishibumi writes that he likes to pair the main characters: Rias and Akeno are the big sister duo, Asia and Xenovia are the church-related duo who become friends, Gasper and Koneko are the young first-years, and Issei and Yuuto are the guys.

When Rias' English voice actress Jamie Marchi was writing the dub script, she noted it was a breast-centric show, even noting that they have sound effects for when they move. She saw the main heroine Rias was calm and stern and a character that she isn't used to playing. She also liked giving the side characters more personality. Marchi says that Rias is a straightforward character who is not as sassy as the redheaded anime girls she sees in other shows. Ishibumi also agrees with the appeal of the characters', including Rias' oppai (breasts) especially in later volumes of the light novels, and had planned to make the heroines more erotic, especially in the side story volumes that focus on comedy.

Rias is voiced by Yōko Hikasa in Japanese and Jamie Marchi in English.

Appearances

Rias Gremory is the main female protagonist of the series; she revives Issei after he is killed by Raynare.

Rias develops feelings for Issei over the course of the series. In the storyline where she is to be Riser Phoenix's fiancée, she resigns her Rating Game against him in order to save Issei; however, after Issei subsequently defeats Riser, she kisses him and moves into his family's home. She does not mind being intimate with Issei, but gets upset when other girls want to steal him away. Later, Rias' mother, Venelana, encourages her to push her relationship further with Issei (in which Rias would attempt to seduce Issei), but gets upset when Issei could not call her by her name. Eventually, Issei finally professes his love for her and calls Rias by her first name instead of her President title. She cries tears of joy and tells him that she feels the same way and the two officially become a couple. Though it seems none of the other girls (Akeno, Xenovia, Asia, Koneko, Irina, Rossweisse and Ravel) have given up on Issei. She has also shown more tolerance towards Issei's dreams of becoming Harem King, even allowing everyone to make dates with Issei with the understanding that he will always return to her afterwards. At her graduation, Issei proposes to Rias; which Rias accepts, becoming one of the his fiancées.

Her brother is one of the Four Great Devils, Lucifer, and both of them possess the Power of Destruction that was inherited by their mother, who came from the House of Bael, which are famous for that power.
Rias eventually masters a new finishing attack during her training with Akeno. She later leaves for Romania with Kiba and Azazel to know more about Gasper's ability. In volume 16 she finally shows her new move, called Extinguished Star; Rias manipulates her Power of Destruction into a compression of unimaginable amounts of demonic power; takes form of an enormous sphere with a mixture of crimson and black aura radiating from inside of it that launches it toward her enemies in a slow velocity. It has the ability of a magnetic force; pulling the enemies towards it and get disintegrate by the latter.

Reception

Critical commentary

Rias has received generally positive critical reception. Jeff Chuang of Japanator.com reviewed Rias positively, complimenting her character design in general, writing that "the character's [Rias'] silhouette works so well that the shape of her hair draws your attention to her fierce, but perfect face", and the voice acting portrays her as a "cool beauty" well. He opined that this was a good thing, as "High School DxD features Rias an awful lot - both in terms of marketing material and also how the anime puts her in some pretty cool still shots." Similarly, Davey C. Jones of Active Anime found Rias to be "phenomenal", finding the "extremely sexy smoking hot redhead" to be "mysterious, sexy, brazen, and coy all at once." He also praised the English dub and breadth of the characters. Sheena McNeil of Sequential Tart also commended the diversity and character designs in the High School DxD anime, including Rias.

THEM Anime Reviews' Stig Høgset found Rias' personality to be "an even mix of a lot of things", pointing out the relationship between her and Issei to be similar to those of a big sister and little brother, yet, despite this being "endearing", her character is "kind of a badass as well". However, Rias' role as a damsel in distress trope in the last few episodes of the anime was criticized, as well as the "inevitability that Rias ends up falling in love with [Issei]." Zac Bertschy of Anime News Network, in his preview guide of winter 2012 anime, found High School DxD to be "a fanservice show, one that yet again plays with the master/slave relationship", except unlike most others, the female (Rias) is in the "master" role. Despite this, since Rias is "naked for what seems like most of her screen time [...] and is introduced to us by stripping in front of the camera and showering", Bertschy writes that perhaps "this is the fanservice show that caters to dudes who want to be dominated." Carl Kimlinger, however, found Issei to be a "loathsome little creature" and Rias to be uninteresting, while complaining about what he perceived to be the series' poor storyline.

Theron Martin, in Anime News Network's official review of the High School DxD television series, critiqued the "voluptuous" Rias' character as distinguishing herself by "not being a tsundere [unlike the series' other characters], instead being a more dignified noblewoman [...] who gradually starts to be attracted to Issei for his unqualified admiration and devotion." Martin however found Jamie Marchi's voice acting to not suit the character very well, while Jamie Marchi's performance as Rias was Behind the Voice Actors' Standout Performance of their dub review. Jamie Marchi's performance was also the winner of Behind The Voice Actors' Staff Choice and People's Choice Awards for "Best Female Lead Vocal Performance in an Anime Television Series/OVA" of 2013 for their 2nd Annual Anime Dub Awards. Chris Beveridge of The Fandom Post commended High School DxDs plotline as interesting, including Rias' complex backstory, claiming "Rias and her family and the whole Devil aspect builds up in a really intriguing way since there’s a sense of history about it, but also a sense of change." He also enjoyed the relationship between Issei and Rias, since while "Rias does have certain feelings for Issei", his lust for her was initially unreciprocated. Beveridge, whilst reviewing episode 2 of the High School DxD anime, found her to be also "a real bit of fun", enjoying Rias' "commanding style" and playfulness with Issei.

Popularity
In an internet poll conducted on Facebook by Tokyo Otaku Mode, which polled male or female respondents on which anime characters they most want to date, Rias placed seventh for female characters. A listing by English media website The Richest of the "10 Sexiest Females of Japanese Anime" placed Rias 2nd, with Cara Clegg of Rocket News 24 writing "A sexy pure-blooded Devil, Rias is blessed with a beautiful face and body, top grades, and a great personality." Another poll by Japanese internet provider BIGLOBE which asked responders to survey their favorite characters from anime released in the first half of 2012 ranked Rias sixth, with 432 votes. Anime website Charapedia hosted a survey of 10,000 fans to find the most "charming busty characters" in anime and manga, where Rias placed 20th with 140 points. Rias received 73 votes in an Anime Saimoe Tournament hosted by 2channel where respondents were tasked with finding the most moe characters of 2012.

In a poll conducted by anime website GoBoiano, Rias Gremory placed third on a list of "35 Anime Characters That Prove Red is The Fiercest Color". Rias then placed fourth on a list of the "Top 23 Most Perverted Female Anime Characters" in another GoBoiano poll. Rias made the shortlist of Orzzzz's "9 Stunningly Beautiful and Strong Red-Haired Female Anime Characters", where she placed sixth; writing "Her long and beautiful crimson hair is the most distinctive feature of this lady with a single hair strand sticking out from the top." She also topped the list of their "Top 10 Hottest High School DxD Characters", as "[Rias] is obviously a beautiful, hot and sexy woman."

Merchandise

The popularity of her character has also seen Rias being featured in several High School DxD related merchandise. This includes character figurines by figure producers A+ and Chara-Ani, which feature her in black leather thigh high boots and bikini, and posing with chess pieces in white respectively. A third figurine of Rias in a bunny girl suit was released by FREEing and Good Smile Company in August 2014. A fourth, again made by A+, featured a tanned version of Rias' figure with removable wings and base. Dragon Magazine, in which High School DxD is serialized, featured a Rias-inspired "breast book cover" given away with the magazine's November 2014 issue. Rias Gremory dakimakura, or body pillows, have also previously been released by distributor AniBro Gamers. Rias also appeared in the High School DxD video game adaption for the Nintendo 3DS, with customers who ordered a special version of the game receiving a pair of earbuds shaped like Rias' breasts in a bra, a cord manager strap custom-made for the earbuds with Rias art, and two decorative rubber bands with the anime logo and Rias' bra, amongst other bonuses. The character has also been a subject of cosplay, with a cosplay of Rias placing 31st on Paste magazine's list of the best cosplay at Chicago Comic and Entertainment Expo 2012.

Notes

References

Cited works
Light novels

 Vol. 1:  
 Vol. 5:  
 Vol. 7:  

Anime

Season 1
 EP 3:  "I Made a Friend!"
 EP 5:  "I Will Defeat My Ex-girlfriend!"
 EP 11:  "The Acclaimed Battle Continues!"
 EP 12:  "I'm Here To Keep My Promise!"

Season 2
 EP 1:  "Another Disquieting Premonition!"
 EP 7:  "Summer! Bathing Suits! I'm In Trouble!"
 EP 8:  "Open House Begins!"

External links 
 Rias Gremory at IMDb

Literary characters introduced in 2008
Female characters in anime and manga
Anime and manga characters who can teleport
Anime and manga characters who use magic
Female soldier and warrior characters in anime and manga
Fictional demons and devils
Internet memes
High School DxD